The discography of the South Korean–Japanese girl group Iz*One consists of two studio albums, four extended plays and seven singles.  As of May 2021, Iz*One has sold over 2.79 million combined albums.

The duodecet's debut release, the Color*Iz EP, was released on October 29, 2018. The Korean release was followed with the group's Japanese debut single, "Suki to Iwasetai", released on February 6, 2019, under UMG's EMI Records label. It subsequently became the group's first release to receive a Platinum certification.

Studio albums

Extended plays

Singles

As lead artist

Promotional singles

Collaborations

Other charted songs

Guest appearances

Videography

Music videos

: All Re-Released on Twelve

Other videos

DVD

Notes

References

External links
 

Discography
Iz*One
Iz*One